The International Union of Wood, Wire and Metal Lathers (WWML) was a labor union representing workers involved in erecting lath, plasterboard and flooring in the United States and Canada.

History
The union was established on December 15, 1899, at a congress in Detroit, and it was chartered by the American Federation of Labor on January 15, 1900.  It had 17,000 members by 1925.  In 1955, it switched affiliation to the new AFL-CIO, and by 1957, it had 16,500 members.  Membership in 1975 was slightly lower, at 14,428.  On August 16, 1979, it merged into the United Brotherhood of Carpenters and Joiners of America.

Presidents
1903: J. E. Toale
1904: William J. McSorley
1926: John H. Bell
1929: William J. McSorley
1955: Lloyd A. Mashburn
1964: Sal Maso
1970: Robert Georgine
1971: Kenneth M. Edwards
1976: Charles Brodeur

References

Building and construction trade unions
Trade unions established in 1899
Trade unions disestablished in 1979